The finals and the qualifying heats of the men's 100 metre butterfly event at the 1998 World Aquatics Championships were held on Friday 1998-01-16 in Perth, Western Australia.

A Final

B Final

Qualifying heats

Note: This is not a complete list of results. The SwimNews source below lists 70 swimmers entered in the event. One of the non-list swimmers is very likely Kamal Salman Masud who set a Pakistan Record of 58.19.

Remarks

See also
1996 Men's Olympic Games 100m Butterfly (Atlanta)
1997 Men's World SC Championships 100m Butterfly (Gothenburg)
1997 Men's European LC Championships 100m Butterfly (Seville)
2000 Men's Olympic Games 100m Butterfly (Sydney)

References

Swimming at the 1998 World Aquatics Championships